Pat Carroll (born September 10, 1982) is a retired American professional basketball player. He is a shooting guard who is a three-point specialist.

He played high school basketball at Hatboro-Horsham High School in Horsham, Pennsylvania under coach Walt Ostrowski. He played college basketball at the Saint Joseph's University for Phil Martelli and played with Chris Michaels and future National Basketball Association players Jameer Nelson, Delonte West and Dwayne Jones, being an integral part of Saint Joe's NCAA Elite Eight run in the 2003–2004 season, his junior year.

He, with his brother, Matt, who starred at the University of Notre Dame and played for the NBA's Charlotte Bobcats along with several other teams, and his grandfather, legendary Pennsylvania high school coach Don Graham began Carroll Camps, a basketball camp run by the brothers to teach the fundamentals of basketball, specifically shooting.

Like his brother, Carroll went undrafted out of college. He has been playing in Europe after going unsigned by an NBA team, having unsuccessful tries so far. After injuring his shoulder in a game in Italy in 2005, Carroll returned to the U.S. to undergo surgery and rehabilitate, missing the entire season.

On July 2, 2006, The Philadelphia Inquirer reported that the Houston Rockets had invited Carroll to play on its summer league team in Las Vegas from July 6–14. On August 17, 2006, Carroll signed a contract with the Dallas Mavericks but was waived October 15 before the 2006–07 season started. He would spend that season with France's BCM Gravelines.

Pat also played for the Iowa Energy in the NBA D-League.

Personal
Father John played football at Penn State University.
Grandfather coached basketball at Pittsburgh's North Catholic High School and is the winningest coach in Pennsylvania history.

External links
D-League stats
Spanish League stats
Carroll Camps

1982 births
Living people
American expatriate basketball people in France
American expatriate basketball people in Greece
American expatriate basketball people in Spain
American men's basketball players
Basketball players from Pittsburgh
BCM Gravelines players
CB Lucentum Alicante players
Real Betis Baloncesto players
Greek Basket League players
Ikaros B.C. players
Iowa Energy players
Liga ACB players
Saint Joseph's Hawks men's basketball players
Shooting guards
Tenerife CB players